The Kuznetsov NK-6 was a low-bypass afterburning turbofan engine, designed by the Kuznetsov Design Bureau.

Development
Development of the NK-6 started in 1955 at the Kuznetsov Design Bureau. It was the first afterburning by-pass engine made in the Soviet Union. Despite this fact, development of the NK-6 was halted in July 1963. The accumulated experience of the NK-6 project was subsequently used in the development of the NK-144. 

Applications
 Project "106" (proposed)
 Tupolev Tu-95LL (testbed)
 Tupolev Tu-123 (proposed)
 Tupolev Tu-125 (proposed)
 Tupolev Tu-135 (proposed)

Specifications (NK-6)

See also

References

Low-bypass turbofan engines
1950s turbofan engines
Kuznetsov aircraft engines